The James Bradley House is a historic house on a Southern plantation in Dixon Springs, Tennessee, United States.

Location
The house is located on Lovers Lane in Dixon Springs, a small town in Smith County, Tennessee.

History
The 367-acree plantation belonged to William Sanders, a planter. In the 1790s, James Bradley, a veteran of the American Revolutionary War, moved from Caswell County, North Carolina to Smith County, Tennessee, and purchased the plantation from Sanders. Bradley owned 55 African slaves.

By 1805, Bradley commissioned the construction of this two-story house in the Federal architectural style. It was built with red bricks, with the green gable roof made with limestone. The roof has a chimney on each side.

Architectural significance
It has been listed on the National Register of Historic Places since September 18, 1978.

See also
 National Register of Historic Places listings in Smith County, Tennessee

References

Antebellum architecture
Federal architecture in Tennessee
Houses in Smith County, Tennessee
Houses on the National Register of Historic Places in Tennessee
Plantation houses in Tennessee
National Register of Historic Places in Smith County, Tennessee